The 2002 Pakistani provincial elections may refer to:

2002 Balochistan provincial election
2002 North-West Frontier Province provincial election
2002 Punjab provincial election
2002 Sindh provincial election

2002 elections in Pakistan
Provincial elections in Pakistan